The House of the Lost Court is a 1915 American drama silent film directed by Charles Brabin and written by A.M. Williamson. The film stars Robert Conness, Duncan McRae, Helen Strickland, Sally Crute, Viola Dana and Margery Bonney. The film was released on May 6, 1915, by Paramount Pictures.

Plot

A young English aristocrat, Anthony, becomes secretly engaged to a woman, Eleanor, but instead she marries his brother. Anthony moves to the United States, and another woman, Nina, asks to go with him. He rejects her request. Pamela Short explains, 'After Nina sees Elinore stab herself, she threatens to accuse Anthony of murder unless he takes her, but still he refuses.' Anthony is found guilty of her death. However, the day after the verdict is pronounced, he is reported dead in his own prison cell. Years later, Anthony is found living in a secret room. While in jail, his mother gave him a potion which made him appear dead. Therefore, Nina gets tricked into confessing to the crime.

Cast 
Robert Conness as Sir Anthony Elliott
Duncan McRae as Honorable Captain Paul Elliott
Helen Strickland as Lady Rosamund
Sally Crute as Nina Desmond
Viola Dana as Dolores Edgerton
Margery Bonney Erskine as Mrs. Edgerton
Gertrude McCoy as Elinore Vane
William West as The Butler

References

External links 
 

1915 films
1910s English-language films
Silent American drama films
1915 drama films
Paramount Pictures films
Films directed by Charles Brabin
American black-and-white films
American silent feature films
Films based on works by Alice Williamson
1910s American films